Tullio Covre (7 November 1917 in Villafranca Padovana – 2 July 1961 in Messina) was a World War II ace of Italian aviation and aerobatic instructor.

Biography 
An ace of Italian aviation, he was active from 1935 to 1945 as a military pilot and afterwards as a flying instructor and aerobatics instructor at the Aero Club of Boscomantico at Verona.

He volunteered for the Royal Italian Air Force at the age of 17. On 24 August 1935 he qualified as "pilota d’aeroplano" (pilot) and was enrolled in the Regia Aeronautica (the Royal Italian Air Force).
On 16 January 1936 he specialised at the Scuola Caccia di Aviano (a school for fighter pilots), in the Pordenone province.
In 1937 he was posted to Addis Ababa, Jimma and Gondar in East Africa, in the 116th squadron with the assault formation. He contracted malaria and had to return home, but in 1938 he returned to active service.

In 1939 he was in Apulia and then Hungary, where he trained 60 fighter pilots. He was awarded the prestigious Eagle of Saint Stephen (Hungarian pilot’s licence) and the Cross of Saint Stephen. In February 1940 he was promoted to Sergeant Major and joined the 54th fighter squadron. In the first phase of the Second World War he participated in the brief life of the Corpo Aereo Italiano in Belgium, in the 20th Group of the "Gatto Nero" (Black Cat). He then went to Libya for six months with the same group. In August 1943 he went to Campoformido, with the 1st Fighter Group. After the armistice on 8 September he joined the Aeronautica Nazionale Repubblicana (National Republican Air Force), in the "Diavoli Rossi" (Red Devils) Squadron, and fought in west Veneto. On 31 October 1944 he shot down a P47 Thunderbolt, and in December he had a dogfight with a Spitfire and made an emergency landing at Thiene. In the following March he shot down a B.25 Mitchell from the 310th Bomber Group based in Corsica. In April 1945 he flew to Aviano to instruct the pilots who had been newly assigned to the "Red Devils", with a two seat Me 109 trainer. He took part in the last combat in southern Garda in which the sergeant Renato Patton lost his life, the last of the Republican Air Force to die. He re-entered combat with the Mustang of the 317th squadron (325º Fighter Group, nicknamed the "Checkertail Clan") flying in a pair with the aircraft of sergeant Antonio Tampieri. They were attacked and strafed and Covre received damage to his aircraft's glycol tank, and there was an explosion in the cockpit. He was about to bail out, but just before jumping he became aware of an attack from behind on Tampieri. He re-entered the aircraft to warn Tampieri by radio, and then he jumped out but became entangled in the antenna of the aircraft. He managed to free himself at the last moment. Tampieri, warned of the danger, avoided the attack and returned to base.

Personal life
Tullio Covre got married in 1945 and had seven children.

Honors 

He was awarded two silver medals for valour. The motivation was: " A pilot of great courage and enthusiasm, he carried into the battle of Sidi El Barrani the faith and the impetus of Italian fighters. He cooperated in the shooting down of 12 aircraft, 50 mechanised transports, encampments and shacks, bringing destruction to the enemy camp. In a subsequent battle he cooperated in shooting down 14 enemy aircraft. (...) A fighter pilot of great skill and courage during the battle of Marmarica, in fierce and violent fights he valiantly sustained the brunt of the superior enemy forces and contributed to the downing of a number of enemy aircraft"

In Libya however he suffered health problems and was repatriated again. From 1940 to 1941 Tullio Covre carried out more than 110 combat flights and shot down 5 aircraft.

Additionally, he was awarded: 
Eagle of Saint Stephen (Hungarian pilot’s licence)
Cross of Saint Stephen

Peacetime 
After the end of the Second World War Tullio Covre is a civil instructor and dedicates himself to sport flying. He assembles the first 3 aircraft civil aerobatic formation at Boscomantico near Verona, called "Frecce Rosse".
In 1961 he purchases a Falco from the company Aeromere of Gardolo di Trento, Italy. During the early trials the variable-pitch propeller presents some problems and is replaced with a fixed-pitch unit. On 24 and 25 June 1961 he participates with the newly purchased Falco in the Giro del Golfo (Naples, Italy), after which he returns to Gardolo to change the propeller again. A new Aeromatic variable pitch prop is fitted, the only one available in the warehouse. On 28 June he leaves for Catania and on the 30th flies to Palermo. On Saturday 1 July 1961 he takes part in the prestigious Giro di Sicilia (Sicily, Italy) and completes the first stage from Palermo to Catania.

Accident and death 
On Sunday 2 July the second stage, Catania-Palermo, begins. Whilst he is over the beach of Mare Grosso, near Messina, the propeller fails and it loses a blade. Covre, now in full emergency, tries to land on the beach below that is crowded with bathers and students, he gestures from the window, but his desperate signals are interpreted as a salutation. Covre decides to ditch in the sea, not a manoeuvre that should present particular difficulty for a pilot of his experience and ability. In the impact with the water he strikes his head against the metal of the radio, is knocked out and the aircraft sinks. The aircraft is recovered a full three days later due to the strong currents.
His heroic gesture would be honoured by the Carnegie Foundation who awards Covre with the silver medal for civil valour: " The board of directors at the meeting of 30 May 1963 have granted the medal of second degree to the memory of Tullio Covre, pilot, for the following act of heroism performed on 2 July 1961 in Messina: "Whilst he was participating in the Tour of Sicily by aeroplane, finding himself in difficulty due to an engine failure, he tried to carry out a forced landing on the beach, attempting to distance the numerous bathers, amongst which there were children from a colony; but his signals were interpreted as a greeting wave and no one moved away. To avoid a massacre he managed to turn the aircraft out to sea, going down with the aircraft: a shining example of the most noble altruism."
The memory of Tullio Covre is also remembered on a commemorative stone at the airport of Boscomantico, placed there in 1962. The Air Force awards him the silver medal for aeronautic valour. Verona has dedicated a street to his name.

Bibliography 
 Nino Arena, L'Aeronautica Nazionale Repubblicana. La guerra aerea in Italia 1943-1945, Ermanno Albertelli Editore, Parma, 1995
 Gianni Cantù, VERONA VOLAT - Un secolo di aviazione a Verona, Cierre Grafica, Sommacampagna (VR),2013

Memorials 
 The municipality of Verona, the city where Covre settled with his family after World War II, has dedicated a street to his name.
 The memory of Tullio Covre is also remembered on a commemorative stone at the airport of Boscomantico (Verona), placed there in 1962.

Trivia 
 He was famous for being a courageous and highly skilled pilot, but not particularly disciplined. He was nicknamed "otto di rigore" which is the expression to indicate the typical punishment for undisciplined soldiers: eight days of solitary confinement.

External links 

1917 births
1961 deaths
Italian World War II flying aces
Military personnel from Verona
Recipients of the Silver Medal of Military Valor
Recipients of the Iron Cross (1939), 2nd class